This Time is the eighth studio album by German singer Thomas Anders. It was released by Na Klar! and BMG on 23 February 2004. His first solo album after six years of hiatus, it peaked at number 14 on the German Albums Chart. The album is Anders' 19th album, other releases included.

Track listing
All tracks co-produced by Thomas Anders.

Personnel and credits 
Adapted from album booklet.

 Thomas Anders – co-producer, executive producer
 Tom Appl – mixing
 Axel Breitung – producer
 Timo Hohnholz – producer
 Alonzo da Silva – producer
 Sebastian da Silva – producer

 Peter Ries – mixing, producer
 Ralph Suda – arranger, producer
 Sven – producer
 Martin Warnke – arranger, producer
 Carten Wegener – producer

Charts

References

2004 albums
Thomas Anders albums